Fruits and Farinacea: The Proper Food of Man, Being an Attempt to Prove, from History, Anatomy, Physiology, and Chemistry, that the Original, Natural, and Best Diet of Man is Derived from the Vegetable Kingdom is an 1845 book advocating vegetarianism by John Smith (of Malton).

It was first published by John Churchill, then republished in 1854 with notes and illustrations by Russell Trall. A condensed version was published in 1873, edited by Professor Francis William Newman for the Vegetarian Society.

Description

Smith cited research from anatomy, chemistry, history, and physiology that the natural food of man is a vegetarian diet. Smith cited the Bible as evidence that fruit and farinacea are the original food of man in the Garden of Eden before the fall of man. He documented how ancient peoples mentioned in the Bible and early nations lived on a fruit and farinaceous diet.

Smith argued from the shape and size of human teeth, conformation of the jaw, length of alimentary canal and other anatomical evidence that man was not intended to be either carnivorous or omnivorous. He stated that a vegetarian diet is sufficient to maintain physical activity and strength, extremes of temperature and warm climates are best endured on a vegetarian rather than a meat diet.  He argued that food derived from animals is the main cause of severe diseases and the constant use of animal food causes gout, rheumatism and many other disorders. Smith believed that a vegetarian diet is more pleasurable and favourable to mental vigour and the development of moral faculties and is best favourable to good health and longevity.

The 1845 edition was dedicated to William Lambe. Historian James Gregory has described the book as a "major text" for the vegetarian movement.

Reception

The book was negatively reviewed in many medical journals for using outdated sources from ancient history or utilizing incorrect arguments from physiology. The earliest reviews of the book were most favourable.

It was positively reviewed in the Provincial Medical and Surgical Journal in 1845, which described it as a "curious and interesting work". The Edinburgh Medical and Surgical Journal gave the book a detailed fourteen page review which was supportive of Smith's arguments against excessive meat consumption but recommended a mixed diet as the most suitable.

In 1846, The Medico-Chirurgical Review commented:

A reviewer in the Monthly Journal of Medical Science in 1849 took issue with the book because many of the cases Smith cited of individuals and communities of people living on a vegetable diet were not living on a strict vegetable diet, as they were also consuming milk. Smith's book appeared to argue for an ovo-lacto vegetarian diet but this was never specified. This also contradicted his statement that "vegetables contain all the elements and qualities necessary for the complete nutrition of man." The reviewer agreed with Smith that many people eat too much meat but concluded the book was too extreme in promoting the total exclusion of all meat from the diet.

The New York Medical Gazette and Journal of Health praised Smith's writing and described it as "the best book on the subject, and immeasurably superior to any which have been written here in this department." However, the reviewer criticized Russell Trall's added notes as a salesman advertisement for other publications. A reviewer in the New Hampshire Journal of Medicine in 1854 was unconvinced by Smith's arguments against meat and also criticized the notes of Russell Trall as shameless sales promotion.

A review in the Chemical News and Journal of Industrial Science in 1874, commented that Smiths "arguments and proofs are in the main so unsatisfactory, that we
are more inclined than ever to be omnivorous". It was negatively reviewed in the Quarterly Journal of Science which concluded that "we have been unable to find a trace of sound logic or convincing argument in the whole book, and are more than ever assured that our omnivorous diet is the right one."

The British Medical Journal attacked the book in a 1897 review as non-scientific. The review noted that Smith utilized sources from ancient history which are obsolete from scientific advances and that his arguments from religion were "fanciful". The book was mocked for making incorrect claims from physiology. For example, Smith was unaware about the function of the pancreas and made the false suggestion that it secretes nitrogen if it lacks in food.

Other works

In 1860, Smith authored Principles and Practice of Vegetarian Cookery, an ovo-lacto vegetarian cookbook.

References

External links
Fruits and Farinacea: The Proper Food of Man

1845 non-fiction books
1854 non-fiction books
1873 non-fiction books
Books about vegetarianism
English non-fiction books